ARY Digital UK is a British Pakistani Urdu entertainment channel, It is the British feed of ARY Digital This feed is available in the United Kingdom, Ireland, and Europe.

The channel broadcasts on linear television as well as streaming programs on YouTube and ARY ZAP.  Special l clips are available on all YouTube, Instagram, Facebook, Twitter and TikTok platforms under ARY Digital Asia.

History 
ARY Network was launched in the United Kingdom in December 2000 as the Pakistani channel to cater to the Pakistani community living in the region. It used Samacom, an uplink provider based in the UAE, as the uplink teleport station.

Between 2001 - 2005, the channel rebranded to ARY Digital. It started off with a format similar to PTV Prime and other South Asian channels; it provided slots for soap operas in general while presenting an hourly slot for news headlines.

In February 2017, ARY Network UK, which consisted of ARY Digital, ARY News, ARY QTV, ARY World News and ARY Entertainment was banned in the UK.

In March 2017, a company called New Vision TV bought the rights to broadcast ARY News and ARY Digital in the UK. In April 2017, ARY News was relaunched as New Vision TV ARY World, airing content from ARY News and some UK based shows. On 12 December 2017, ARY Digital UK relaunched as ARY Family airing content from ARY Digital and launching a few UK based shows.

On 13 November 2020, ARY Family UK rebranded to ARY Digital UK  airing content from ARY Digital and some shows for UK viewers.

Programming
The channel line-up include dramas, sitcoms, comedy, feature films, teleplay, educational shows and series. The channel also broadcast religious shows during Islamic events.

Serials

Sitcom

Non-scripted/reality shows

ARY Digital UK exclusives

Upcoming broadcast

Controversy
In February 2017, ARY Network UK, which consisted of ARY Digital UK, ARY News, ARY QTV, ARY World News and ARY Entertainment was banned in the UK.

References

Mass media companies of the United Arab Emirates
Television channels in the United Kingdom
ARY Digital
Television channels and stations established in 2017